Laurel Lake Mills is an historic textile mill site located at 951 Broadway in Fall River, Massachusetts.

The company was organized in 1881 for the manufacture of cotton yarns, with John P. Slade its first president. Mill No. 1 was built soon after.
The attached Mill No. 2 was later added. The mills were steam powered and are constructed of native Fall River granite.

Production of textiles ceased in 1931.

The site was determined eligible for the National Historic Register in 1983, but omitted due to owner's objection.

See also
National Register of Historic Places listings in Fall River, Massachusetts
List of mills in Fall River, Massachusetts

References

Industrial buildings and structures on the National Register of Historic Places in Massachusetts
Textile mills in Fall River, Massachusetts
National Register of Historic Places in Fall River, Massachusetts